The 2022 PBA Philippine Cup, also known as the 2022 Honda PBA Philippine Cup for sponsorship reasons, was the first conference of the 2022–23 PBA season of the Philippine Basketball Association (PBA). The 44th PBA Philippine Cup started on June 5 and ended on September 4, 2022. The tournament did not allow teams to hire foreign players or imports. The conference also served as a qualification to the 2022–23 East Asia Super League, wherein the conference finalists will be the Philippines' representatives to the international club league.

Format
The following format will be observed for the duration of the conference:
 Single-round robin eliminations; 11 games per team; Teams are then seeded by basis on win-loss records.
Top eight teams will advance to the quarterfinals. In case of tie, playoff games will be held only for the #8 seed.
Quarterfinals:
QF1: #1 vs #8 (#1 twice-to-beat)
QF2: #2 vs #7 (#2 twice-to-beat)
QF3: #3 vs #6 (best-of-3 series)
QF4: #4 vs #5 (best-of-3 series)
Semifinals (best-of-7 series):
SF1: QF1 Winner vs. QF4 Winner
SF2: QF2 Winner vs. QF3 Winner
Finals (best-of-7 series)
F1: SF1 Winner vs SF2 Winner

Elimination round

Team standings

Schedule

Results

Bracket

Quarterfinals

(1) San Miguel vs. (8) Blackwater 
San Miguel has the twice-to-beat advantage; they have to be beaten twice, while their opponents just once, to advance.

(2) TNT vs. (7) Converge 
TNT has the twice-to-beat advantage; they have to be beaten twice, while their opponents just once, to advance.

(3) Magnolia vs. (6) NLEX 
This is a best-of-three playoff.

(4) Barangay Ginebra vs. (5) Meralco 
This is a best-of-three playoff.

Semifinals
All match-ups are best-of-seven playoffs.

(1) San Miguel vs. (5) Meralco

(2) TNT vs. (3) Magnolia

Finals

This is a best-of-seven playoff. The two finalists also qualify to the 2022–23 East Asia Super League season.

Awards

Players of the Week

Statistics

Individual statistical leaders

Individual game highs

Team statistical leaders

Notes

References

Philippine Cup
PBA Philippine Cup